The 1983–84 OJHL season is the 12th season of the Ontario Junior Hockey League (OJHL). The eight teams of the league played a 42-game season. The all eight teams made the playoffs.

The winner of the OJHL playoffs, the Orillia Travelways, won the OHA Buckland Cup and then the Dudley Hewitt Cup as Central Canadian champions. In 1984, the Callaghan Cup champion from the east did not compete in the National playdowns, so the Travelways gained a direct berth into the 1984 Centennial Cup. The Travelways failed to win the Centennial Cup.

Changes
OJHL reverts from two-division system to a single, non-partitioned standings.
Richmond Hill Rams become the Richmond Hill Dynes.
Cambridge Winterhawks leave OJHL for MWJHL.

Final standings
Note: GP = Games played; W = Wins; L = Losses; OTL = Overtime losses; SL = Shootout losses; GF = Goals for; GA = Goals against; PTS = Points; x = clinched playoff berth; y = clinched division title; z = clinched conference title

1983-84 OJHL Playoffs

Quarter-final
Dixie Beehives defeated Aurora Tigers 4-games-to-none
Orillia Travelways defeated Markham Waxers 4-games-to-none
North York Rangers defeated Richmond Hill Rams 4-games-to-2
Newmarket Flyers defeated Hamilton Mountain A's 4-games-to-none
Semi-final
Orillia Travelways defeated North York Rangers 4-games-to-none
Dixie Beehives defeated Newmarket Flyers 4-games-to-3
Final
Orillia Travelways defeated Dixie Beehives 4-games-to-1

OHA Buckland Cup Championship
The 1984 Buckland Cup was a best-of-5 series between the Rayside-Balfour Canadians (NOJHL) and the Orillia Travelways.  The winner moved on to the 1984 Dudley Hewitt Cup.

Orillia Travelways defeated Rayside-Balfour Canadians (NOJHL) 3-games-to-1
Orillia 8 - Rayside-Balfour 7 OT
Orillia 8 - Rayside-Balfour 1
Rayside-Balfour 7 - Orillia 6
Orillia 4 - Rayside-Balfour 3

Dudley Hewitt Cup Championship
The 1984 Dudley Hewitt Cup was a best-of-7 series between the Pembroke Lumber Kings (CJHL) and the Orillia Travelways.  The winner moved on to the 1984 Centennial Cup.

Orillia Travelways defeated Pembroke Lumber Kings (CJHL) 4-games-to-none
Orillia 9 - Pembroke 5
Orillia 12 - Pembroke 5
Orillia 4 - Pembroke 2
Orillia 8 - Pembroke 3

1984 Centennial Cup Championship
The 1984 Centennial Cup was the best-of-7 Canadian National Junior A championship series between the Eastern Champion Orillia Travelways and the Western Abbott Cup champion Weyburn Red Wings (SJHL).

Weyburn Red Wings (SJHL) defeated Orillia Travelways 4-games-to-3
Orillia 6 - Weyburn 5
Weyburn 6 - Orillia 4
Weyburn 7 - Orillia 4
Orillia 2 - Weyburn 1
Orillia 8 - Weyburn 5
Weyburn 5 - Orillia 4
Weyburn 3 - Orillia 0

Leading Scorers

Players taken in the 1984 NHL Entry Draft
Rd 2 #32	Tony Hrkac -  	St. Louis Blues	(Orillia Travelways)
Rd 10 #196	Tom Tilley -  	St. Louis Blues	(Orillia Travelways)

See also
 1984 Centennial Cup
 Dudley Hewitt Cup
 List of Ontario Hockey Association Junior A seasons
 Thunder Bay Junior A Hockey League
 Northern Ontario Junior Hockey League
 Central Junior A Hockey League
 1983 in ice hockey
 1984 in ice hockey

References

External links
 Official website of the Ontario Junior Hockey League
 Official website of the Canadian Junior Hockey League

Ontario Junior Hockey League seasons
OPJHL